The 2018–19 Northern Arizona Lumberjacks men's basketball team represented Northern Arizona University during the 2018–19 NCAA Division I men's basketball season. The Lumberjacks were led by seventh-year head coach Jack Murphy and played their home games at the Walkup Skydome in Flagstaff, Arizona as members of the Big Sky Conference. They finished the season 10–21, 8–12 in Big Sky play to finish in a tie for eighth place. They lost in the first round of the Big Sky tournament to Sacramento State.

On June 2, 2019, head coach Jack Murphy resigned to become the associate head coach at Arizona. He finished at Northern Arizona with a seven-year record of 78–149.

Previous season
The Lumberjacks finished the 2017–18 season 5–27, 2–16 in Big Sky play to finish in last place. They lost in the first round of the Big Sky tournament to Northern Colorado.

Offseason

Departures

Incoming transfers

2018 incoming recruits

Roster

Schedule and results

|-
!colspan=9 style=| Non-conference regular season

|-
!colspan=9 style=| Big Sky regular season

|-
!colspan=9 style=| Big Sky tournament

References

Northern Arizona Lumberjacks men's basketball seasons
Northern Arizona
Northern Arizona Lumberjacks men's basketball
Northern Arizona Lumberjacks men's basketball